Stephen Taber (March 7, 1821 – April 23, 1886) was a farmer and businessman from New York. A Democrat, he was most notable for his service as a U.S. Representative from 1865 to 1869.

Biography
Taber was born in Dover, New York on March 7, 1821, the son of Thomas Taber II and Phebe (Titus) Taber. He was educated in Dover and Poughkeepsie, moved to Queens, New York and engaged in farming and business.

In addition to farming, Taber assisted in organizing the Long Island North Shore Transportation Company in 1861 and served as its president for several years. He was also a director of the Long Island Rail Road. After moving to Roslyn, New York, he became the first president of the Roslyn Savings Bank in 1876. Taber also helped establish a steamboat route between Roslyn and New York City. As a booster of Roslyn's local economy, Taber took steps to make the village a tourist attraction, including constructing an observation tower and picnic area at the top of Harbor Hill, where Clarence Hungerford Mackay later constructed a mansion.

Political career 
A Democrat, Taber was a member of the New York State Assembly (Queens Co., 1st D.) in 1860 and 1861.

Congress 
In 1864 he was elected to the United States House of Representatives. He was reelected in 1866, and served in the 39th and 40th Congresses (March 4, 1865 – March 3, 1869).

Death 
Taber died in New York City on April 23, 1886. He was buried at Roslyn Cemetery in Roslyn.

Family
In 1845, Taber married Rosetta M. Townsend. They were the parents of five children—Samuel T., William T., Adelaide, Gertrude, and Thomas T.

Taber was the first cousin of George T. Pierce, who served in the New York State Assembly and New York State Senate.

References

External links

 

1821 births
1886 deaths
Democratic Party members of the New York State Assembly
People from Dover, New York
Democratic Party members of the United States House of Representatives from New York (state)
19th-century American politicians